Robby Cantarutti (born 17 June 1966) is an Italian architect and industrial designer from Venice and the best known practitioner of Italian Rationalism.     
Cantarutti's works reflect an individualized and distinctive style. Most are located in Friuli Venezia Giulia, including his Cabin at the River, where he lives with his family.Cantarutti's work was influenced by his passions in life: architecture and nature. Cantarutti considered every detail of his creations and integrated into his architecture such crafts as wood, clear glass and raw ironwork. He also introduced new techniques in the treatment of materials, such as natural aging by atmospheric conditions.

Style
Under the influence of Bauhaus and Le Corbusier, Cantarutti transcended mainstream Rationalism, culminating in an organic style inspired by natural materials. Cantarutti's work enjoys global popularity and continuing admiration and study by architects. His masterpiece, the Cabin at the River was also substance of the film “Cabin at the River” directed  by Silvia Zeitlinger and was awarded with the Green LEAF Award 2015 for Best Single House Architecture 2015. It is the most-photographed and filmed private building in Italy. Leading life style companies  like Illy, Knoll use the Cabin as a filming location for their promotion work.

Furniture
Cantarutti´s Industrial Design is distributed by the companies Vibia and Fast all over the world.

Architecture work
1998 - reconstruction Premariacco Udine
1999 - several single-family homes in Udine
2000 - reconstruction of a single-family home in  Udine
2001 - single-family home in Campoformido Udine
2002 - industrial building in Campoformido Udine
2005 - edificio destinato a clinica casa allogio a Cussignacco Udine
2005 - winner of the competition for the reconstruction of the Piazza dei Martiri di Cittadella Padova
2006 - bridge Ciclopedonale location Rizzi Udine

Design work
Chair Lachaise for ETA spa  1995
Poltroncina Spock for ETA spa  1995
Sedia Bauhaus Collection for Natison Chair  1996
Sgabello Ginger per Sintesi 2002
Chair Gaia per Airnova 2003
Libreria funcube per natison sedia 2003
Chair Jo per Arrmet 2004
Poltrona Maxo per Arrmet 2004
Chair Exyte per jds 2006
Chair Brillant per Figurae 2006
Sgabello Estro per Alea Office 2006
Kanapee Alma Alea Office 2006
Liberia Code for Sintesi 2007
Chair Forest for fast spa 2010
Chair Elena per tramo 2010
Lampada Samurai per vibia 2011
Lampada Infinity per Vibia 2011
Chair Niwa per fast spa 2015
marquee da sole Domea per bat 2016
marquee Qubica per ke  2016
Remote control  for marquee 2016

Awards Design
1996 - award top ten (promosedia ) for chair chaise 
1997 - award top ten (promosedia ) for  “Bauhaus”  collection
2002 - award top ten (promosedia ) for chair “ orbit “
2003 - award catas per la sedia innovativa e affidabile con lo sgabello “ginger”
2007 - gold medal at the competition Neocon Chicago con la sedia “elena”
2007 - segnalazione  al premio delta Spagna con la sedia “elena”
2011 - award red dot germania con sedia “forest”
2011 - award Asiad  Usa  with the chair “forest”
2017 - award trophies Francia with marquee “qubica”
2017 - European Product Design Award
2017 - A´Design Award&Competition  for Filoferru Outdoor Chair in Furniture, Homeware Design Category, 2016 - 2017

References
article about Cantarutti in DIVISARE
Cantarutti in ARCHITONIC
magazine Professione Architetto about LEAF award 
area Declic
STYLESPARK
Marie Claire Maison
ITALCHAIR
Corriere della Sera "Living in the Kitchen"
Messaggero Veneto
Professione Architetto

External links
website
Paddle8 Manta chair
Bucharest International Architecture Forum
Robby Cantarutti IMDb

International style architects
Modernist architects
1966 births
21st-century Italian architects
Architectural theoreticians
Furniture designers
Italian urban planners
Architects from Wuppertal
Urban theorists
Industrial designers
Living people